Berhampore subdivision is an administrative subdivision of Murshidabad district in the state of West Bengal, India.

Overview
The Bhagirathi River splits the district into two natural physiographic regions – Rarh on the west and Bagri on the east. Barhampur subdivision lies in the Ganges-Bhagirathi Basin, which is a long and narrow river valley in the Bagri region. It has fertile soil suitable for cultivation.

History
The famous Chinese scholar Xuanzang mentioned it in his travelogues.

Geography
The headquarters of Murshidabad district are located at Baharampur.

Subdivisions
Murshidabad district is divided into the following administrative subdivisions:

Administrative units
Barhampur subdivision has 7 police stations, 5 community development blocks, 5 panchayat samitis, 61 gram panchayats, 383 mouzas, 323 inhabited villages, 2 municipalities and 10 census towns. The municipalities are: Baharampur and Beldanga. The census towns are: Goaljan, Kasim Bazar, Banjetia, Shib Danga , Gopjan, Gora Bazar, Ajodhya Nagar, Chaltia, Haridasmati and Barua (P). The subdivision has its headquarters at Baharampur.

Police stations
Police stations in Barhampur subdivision have the following features and jurisdiction:

Gram Panchayats
The subdivision contains 61 gram panchayats under 5 community development blocks:

Berhampore CD Block - Bhakuri–I, Haridasmati, Niyallispara Goaljan, Rangamati Chandpara, Bhakuri–II, Hatinagar, Radharghat–II, Chhaighari, Madanpur, Radharghat–I, Satui Chaurigachha, Daulatabad, Manindranagar, Rajdharpara, Gurudaspur, Naodapanur and Sahajadpur.
Beldanga I CD Block - Begunbari, Chaitannapur–II, Mahula–I, Sujapur–Kumarpur, Bhabta–I, Debkundu, Mahula–II, Bhabta–II, Kapasdanga, Mirjapur–I, Chaitannapur–I, Madda and Mirjapur–II
Beldanga II CD Block - Andulberia–I, Kashipur, Rampara–II, Andulberia–II, Ramnagar Bachhra, Shaktipur, Dadpur, Somepara–I, Kamnagar,  Rampara–I and Somepara–II.
Hariharpara CD Block - Beharia, Hariharpara, Malopara, Swaruppur, Choa, Humaipur, Raipur, Dharampur, Khidirpur and Rukunpur.
Naoda CD Block - Bali–I, Kedarchandpur–I, Naoda, Sarangpur, Bali–II, Kedarchandpur–II, Patikabari, Chandpur, Madhupur and Raipur.

Blocks
Community development blocks in Barhampur subdivision are:

Economy

Infrastructure
All inhabited villages in Murshidabad district have power supply.

See the individual block pages for more information about the infrastructure.

Agriculture
Murshidabad is a predominantly agricultural district. A majority of the population depends on agriculture for a living. The land is fertile. The eastern portion of the Bhagirathi, an alluvial tract, is very fertile for growing Aus paddy, jute and rabi crops. The Kalantar area in the south-eastern portion of the district, is a low lying area with stiff dark clay and supports mainly the cultivation of Aman paddy. The west flank of the Bhagirathi is a lateritic tract intersected by numerous bils and old river beds. It supports the cultivation of Aman paddy, sugar cane and mulberry.

Given below is an overview of the agricultural production (all data in tonnes) for Barhampur subdivision, other subdivisions and the Murshidabad district, with data for the year 2013-14.

Education
Murshidabad district had a literacy rate of 66.59% (for population of 7 years and above) as per the census of India 2011. Barhampur subdivision had a literacy rate of 72.60%, Kandi subdivision 66.28%, Jangipur subdivision 60.95%, Lalbag subdivision 68.00% and Domkal subdivision 68.35%.

Given in the table below (data in numbers) is a comprehensive picture of the education scenario in Murshidabad district for the year 2013-14:

Note: Primary schools include junior basic schools; middle schools, high schools and higher secondary schools include madrasahs; technical schools include junior technical schools, junior government polytechnics, industrial technical institutes, industrial training centres, nursing training institutes etc.; technical and professional colleges include engineering colleges, medical colleges, para-medical institutes, management colleges, teachers training and nursing training colleges, law colleges, art colleges, music colleges etc. Special and non-formal education centres include sishu siksha kendras, madhyamik siksha kendras, centres of Rabindra mukta vidyalaya, recognised Sanskrit tols, institutions for the blind and other handicapped persons, Anganwadi centres, reformatory schools etc.

The following institutions are located in Barhampur subdivision:
Murshidabad University was established at Berhampore in 2021.
Krishnath College was established at Baharampur in 1853.  In addition to undergraduate courses it offers post-graduate courses in physiology, sericulture and Sanskrit.
Berhampore College, was initially founded in 1963 as Raja Krishnath College of Commerce, and was renamed in 1975. It is located in Baharampur.
Berhampore Girls' College was established at Baharampur in 1946.
Government College of Engineering & Textile Technology, Berhampore was established at Baharampur in 1928.
Murshidabad College of Engineering & Technology was established at Baharampur in 1998.
Central Sericultural Research and Training Institute is a research station conducted by the Central Silk Board, Ministry of Textiles, Government of India, established at Baharampur in 1943. It conducts a regular post-graduate course in sericulture and tailor-made courses.
Murshidabad Medical College and Hospital was established at Baharampur in 2012.
Hazi A.K. Khan College was established at Hariharpara in 2008.
Sewnarayan Rameswar Fatepuria College was established at Beldanga in 1965.
Jatindra Rajendra Mahavidyalaya was established in 1986 at Amtala.
Union Christian Training College was established at Baharampur in 1938. Affiliated with the West Bengal University of Teachers' Training, Education Planning and Administration for its BEd course, and with the University of Kalyani for its BPEd course.
Monarch College of Art and Technology, is a private college at Baharampur offering courses in animation film making and ceramic design.

Healthcare
The table below (all data in numbers) presents an overview of the medical facilities available and patients treated in the hospitals, health centres and sub-centres in 2014 in Murshidabad district.  
 

.* Excluding nursing homes

Medical facilities in Barhampur subdivision are as follows:

Hospitals: (Name, location, beds)
 Murshidabad District Hospital, Baharampur, 391 beds
 Baharampur General Hospital, Baharampur, 225 beds (running as part of Murshidabad District Hospital)
 Baharampur Central Jail Hospital, Baharampur, 87 beds
 Baharampur Police Hospital, Baharampur, 68 beds
 Borstal Jail Hospital, Baharampur, 10 beds
 Mental Hospital, Baharampur, 350 beds

Rural Hospitals: (Name, block, location, beds)
 Beldanga Rural Hospital, Beldanga Municipality, Beldanga, 30 beds
 Amtala Rural Hospital, Naoda CD Block, Amtala, 50 beds
 Saktipur Rural Hospital, Beldanga II, Shaktipur, 30 beds

Block Primary Health Centres: (Name, block, location, beds)
 Beldanga BPHC, Beldanga I CD Block, Beldanga, 25 beds
 Hariharpara BPHC, Hariharpara CD Block, Hariharpara, 20 beds
 Karnasuvarna BPHC, Berhampre CD Block, Karnasuvarna, 15 beds

Primary Health Centres: (CD Block-wise)(CD Block, PHC location, beds)
 Beldanga I CD Block: Chaitanyapur (10), Gopinathpur (6)
 Beldanga II CD Block: Ramnagar-Bachra, Bachra (10), Sompara (4), Andulberia, Nazirpur (10)
 Naoda CD Block: Gangadhari (10), Sabdarnagar (10), Tungi (6), Sarbangapur (2), Patkabari (10)
 Hariharpara CD Block: Baharan, Baruipara (10), Choan (6), Ghoramara-Mahismara, Mahismara (6)
 Berhampore CD Block: Chourigachha, Satui (10), Hatinagar (10)

Electoral constituencies
Lok Sabha (parliamentary) and Vidhan Sabha (state assembly) constituencies in Barhampur subdivision were as follows:

External links

References

Subdivisions of West Bengal
Subdivisions in Murshidabad district